WODC (93.3 FM) – branded as 93.3 The Bus – is a commercial classic hits radio station licensed to Ashville, Ohio, serving Columbus and the Columbus metro area. Owned by iHeartMedia, Inc., the WODC studios area located in Downtown Columbus, while its transmitter resides near Obetz. In addition to a standard analog transmission, WODC broadcasts over three HD Radio channels, and streams online via iHeartRadio.

History

Early years (1961-2004) 

Originally located at 94.3 FM, WFCB was called "WFCB-94.3", but to clear a move from Chillicothe to Ashville, frequencies were to be exchanged between WFCB and WKKJ, this happened in 2002. WKKJ was a sister Clear Channel station also in Chillicothe, but operating at 93.3 MHz, playing country music. After the switch, WFCB was re-imaged as "Mix 93.3", but continued to run and be staffed from Chillicothe.

Adult contemporary (2004-2011) 
When WFCB's transmitter was officially moved to Obetz on January 1, 2004, the station was flipped to "93.3 Lite FM" and the calls were changed to WLZT. The positioner eventually transitioned from "93.3 Lite FM" to "93.3 WLZT" when the station switched to a more gold-based adult contemporary or classic hits format. After several musical changes, the station re-imaged as "Soft Rock 93.3" in May 2010.

Classic hits (2011-2015) 
On September 2, 2011, on Labor Day weekend, the station began stunting with "America's Top 500." The following Tuesday at 9 a.m., following the holiday, after playing "American Pie" by Don McLean, the station switched to classic hits as "Oldies 93.3." On September 29, 2011, the callsign was changed from WLZT to WODC. In February 2014, 80s music was added and the "Oldies 93.3" moniker was dropped, and was rebranded as "93.3 WODC."

Adult hits (2015-2021) 
At midnight on December 28, 2015, WODC relaunched with an adult hits format, and rebranded as "93.3 The Bus".

A couple of times each year, mostly on holiday weekends that start on Friday and end on Monday (Memorial Day and Labor Day), WODC does an "All-80's Weekend".

Every November, WODC switches over to Christmas music and plays it continuously through Christmas Day.

Classic hits (2021-present) 
In August 2021, WODC repositioned itself as “Columbus’ Classic Hits” and added on-air staff, while retaining the “Bus” branding.  The station transitioned back to a classic hits format, with a more focused playlist on music from the 1970s through 1990s.

In late January 2022, WODC brought back Casey Kasem's American Top 40 every Sunday mornings from 8am to 12 noon. The station previously aired the show with episodes from the 70s and 80s on Sunday mornings from April 2011 to February 2019.

References

External links

FM translators

1978 establishments in Ohio
IHeartMedia radio stations
ODC
Radio stations established in 1978